Charles Henry Smithson Blakey (4 January 1896 – 31 August 1962) was an English footballer who made 30 appearances in the Football League playing for Lincoln City as a goalkeeper. He went on to play for Midland League clubs Doncaster Rovers, Boston Town, and the newly formed Boston United, for whom he played as a defender.

References

1896 births
1962 deaths
Sportspeople from Lincoln, England
English footballers
Association football goalkeepers
Association football defenders
Lincoln City F.C. players
Doncaster Rovers F.C. players
Boston Town F.C. (1920s) players
Boston United F.C. players
English Football League players
Midland Football League players